Jerzy Józef Brzęczek (born 18 March 1971) is a Polish professional football manager and former player.

In a professional career which spanned nearly 20 years and brought 42 caps with the Poland national team, Brzęczek played for clubs in Poland, Austria and Israel. From 2018 to 2021, he was the head coach for the Poland national team.

Club career
During his career, Brzęczek played for Raków Częstochowa, Olimpia Poznań, Lech Poznań, Górnik Zabrze (two spells), GKS Katowice, Tirol Innsbruck (later Wacker Tirol), LASK Linz, Maccabi Haifa, Sturm Graz, FC Kärnten and Polonia Bytom, retiring in 2009 at age 38. Brzęczek picked up championship medals in both Poland (with Lech Poznań in 1993) and Austria (with Tirol Innsbruck in 2001 and 2002).

International career
With 42 caps for the Poland national team to his credit, Brzęczek also represented the national team at the 1992 Summer Olympics, winning silver.

International goals
Scores and results list Poland's goal tally first, score column indicates score after each Brzęczek goal.

Coaching career

Clubs
On 17 November 2014, he became the coach of Lechia Gdańsk, and  he was sacked on 1 September 2015. Then, from the end of September 2015, he was a manager for GKS Katowice. On 20 May 2017, after losing a game against MKS Kluczbork and losing the chances of promotion to the Ekstraklasa, he resigned. On 11 July  2017, he became the coach of Wisła Płock.

Poland
On 12 July 2018 he was announced as the new head coach of the Poland national team.

His tenure didn't start off well, with Poland getting relegated from the 2018–19 UEFA Nations League A, following two losses and two draws. Poland's UEFA Euro 2020 qualifying was more impressive, with the team managing to win four opening matches without conceding a goal. However, after a 2–0 away defeat to Slovenia and a home draw to Austria, Brzęczek faced heavy pressure from the fans calling for his dismissal. Despite this, he managed to keep the team on track with two final wins over Latvia and North Macedonia, eventually qualifying for the UEFA Euro 2020 from the top spot in their group. 

Brzęczek was sacked on 18 January 2021, five months before Poland's first match at the UEFA Euro 2020 and succeeded by the Portugal's Paulo Sousa.

Wisła Kraków
On 14 February 2022, Brzęczek was appointed head coach of Wisła Kraków, replacing Adrián Guľa. Achieving only one win in 13 league games, he was not able to save Wisła from relegation to I liga, their first since they returned to the top division in 1996. With five wins and two draws in 12 games at the start of Wisła's 2022–23 league campaign, Brzęczek left the club.

Personal life
Brzęczek's nephew is a footballer, winger Jakub Błaszczykowski, who has most notably represented Wisła Kraków, Borussia Dortmund and VfL Wolfsburg. His sister, Błaszczykowski's mother, was murdered by her husband which caused family separation.

Managerial statistics

Honours

Player
Lech Poznań
Ekstraklasa: 1992–93

Tirol Innsbruck
Austrian Bundesliga: 2000–01, 2001–02

Poland U23
Summer Olympics: runner-up: 1992

Notes

References

External links
 Maccabi Haifa profile and short bio 
 

1971 births
Living people
Polish footballers
Polish football managers
Association football midfielders
Ekstraklasa players
Lech Poznań players
Górnik Zabrze players
GKS Katowice players
Austrian Football Bundesliga players
FC Tirol Innsbruck players
LASK players
SK Sturm Graz players
FC Kärnten players
Maccabi Haifa F.C. players
Poland international footballers
Olympic footballers of Poland
Footballers at the 1992 Summer Olympics
Olympic silver medalists for Poland
Polish expatriate footballers
Expatriate footballers in Israel
Expatriate footballers in Austria
Olympic medalists in football
People from Kłobuck County
Sportspeople from Silesian Voivodeship
Medalists at the 1992 Summer Olympics
Raków Częstochowa players
Olimpia Poznań players
Polonia Bytom players
Lechia Gdańsk managers
GKS Katowice managers
Raków Częstochowa managers
Wisła Płock managers
Wisła Kraków managers
Ekstraklasa managers
I liga managers
Poland national football team managers
Polish expatriate sportspeople in Austria
Polish expatriate sportspeople in Israel
FC Wacker Innsbruck (2002) players